Good Folk's Sunday is a 1953 Italian comedy film directed by Anton Giulio Majano.

Plot 
Several destinies are displayed as the soccer teams of Rome and Naples meet,  with Sophia Loren in one of the episodes.

Cast 

Maria Fiore: Sandra
Sophia Loren: Ines
Renato Salvatori: Giulio
Vittorio Sanipoli: Conti
Ave Ninchi: Elvira
Alberto Talegalli: Clemente
Carlo Romano: Malesci
Mariolina Bovo: Marisa
Memmo Carotenuto: Amleto
Nino Manfredi: Lello 
Turi Pandolfini: Priest
Piero Palermini: Pieri
Gisella Monaldi: Gisella
Alfredo Martinelli: Valli
Laura Tiberti: Maria
Eduardo Passarelli: Doorman
Nino Vingelli  
Fiorenzo Fiorentini
Bice Valori
Rina Franchetti
Carlo Giuffrè 
Antonio Acqua

References

External links

1953 comedy films
1953 films
Italian comedy films
Films directed by Anton Giulio Majano
Films scored by Nino Rota
Italian black-and-white films
1950s Italian films